The B VIII steam engines of the Royal Bavarian State Railways (Königlich Bayerische Staatsbahn) were  tender locomotives.

This class was a forerunner of the first Bavarian express train locomotive. It was equipped with an inside Stephenson valve gear, inside steam chests, detachable cranks, (Aufsteckkurbel) and a full outside frame (aussenliegender Füllrahmen). The firebox was supported in order to provide a better distribution of weight.

They were equipped with Bavarian 3 T 9 tenders.

See also 
 Royal Bavarian State Railways
 List of Bavarian locomotives and railbuses

External links 
 Railways of Germany forum

2-4-0 locomotives
B 08
Maffei locomotives
Standard gauge locomotives of Germany
Railway locomotives introduced in 1872
1B n2 locomotives

Passenger locomotives